is a train station in the city of Chiba, Chiba Prefecture, Japan.

Lines
 East Japan Railway Company
  Keiyō Line

Station layout 
The station was built as a hybrid structure. The inbound platform for Tokyo is elevated while the outbound platform bound for Soga is located at ground level.

Platforms

History 
Makuharitoyosuna station was proposed as a provisionary station between Kaihimmakuhari Station and Shin-Narashino Station on the Keiyō Line in 1991. The proposal to JR East was made at the request of the Enterprise Bureau of Chiba Prefecture.

The station cost  to build, with retail chain AEON funding half of the construction costs.

Preliminary construction began in September 2022. The station is expected to open in Q2 2023 with the adjoining pedestrian facilities and hotels opening in 2024. Most of the construction work had been finished by September 2022. In December 2022, JR East finalized the opening of the station to take place on 18 March 2023. The station opened as planned on 18 March 2023.

References

External links

Railway stations in Chiba Prefecture
Proposed railway stations in Japan
Railway stations scheduled to open in 2023